is a retired Japanese gymnast. She competed in all artistic gymnastics events at the 1956 and 1960 Summer Olympics and finished sixth and fourth with her teams, respectively. Her best individual result was 13th place in the floor exercise in 1960.

References

1936 births
Living people
Gymnasts at the 1956 Summer Olympics
Gymnasts at the 1960 Summer Olympics
Olympic gymnasts of Japan
Japanese female artistic gymnasts
20th-century Japanese women